Marcelo Antonio Carballo Cadima (born December 7, 1974 in Cochabamba) is a retired Bolivian  football defender.

Club career
Carballo played the majority of his career for Wilstermann and also played for The Strongest between 2002 and 2004.

International career
He earned 11 caps, scoring one goal for Bolivia and represented his country in 6 FIFA World Cup qualification matches.

References

External links

1974 births
Living people
Sportspeople from Cochabamba
Bolivian footballers
Bolivia international footballers
Association football defenders
C.D. Jorge Wilstermann players
The Strongest players
2001 Copa América players